Ruja is the self-titled debut EP by Estonian rock band Ruja.

Track listing

A-side
"Põhi, lõuna, ida, lääs" (North, South, East, West) (Jaanus Nõgisto/Juhan Viiding)
"Keldrikakand" (Rough woodlouse) (Margus Kappel/Hando Runnel)

B-side
"Laul teost" (Song about a snail) (Margus Kappel/Juhan Viiding)
"Üle müüri" (Over the wall) (Jaanus Nõgisto/Juhan Viiding)

Personnel

Urmas Alender (vocals)
Jaanus Nõgisto (guitar)
Margus Kappel (keyboards)
Priit Kuulberg (bass)
Ivo Varts (drums)

External links

1979 debut EPs
Ruja albums
Estonian-language albums